Chirality (handedness) is a property of asymmetry.

Chirality may also refer to:

 Chirality (chemistry), a property of molecules having a non-superimposable mirror image
 Chirality (electromagnetism), an electromagnetic propagation in chiral media
 Chirality (mathematics), the property of a figure not being identical to its mirror image
 Chirality (physics), when a phenomenon is not identical to its mirror image
 Chirality (journal), an academic journal dealing with chiral chemistry
 Chirality (manga), a 4-volume yuri manga series written and illustrated by author Satoshi Urushihara
 Chirality (album), a 2014 solo piano album by American pianist John Burke

See also
 Chirality in gastropods
 Chiral knot
 Handedness